Murricia uva is a species of hersiliid in the spider family Hersiliidae. It is found in a range from Cameroon to Uganda.

References

Hersiliidae
Articles created by Qbugbot
Spiders described in 2008